Hall Christopher Charlton (born 25 October 1979 in Durham) is a former rugby union footballer who played at scrum half for Newcastle Falcons.

Whilst at Newcastle he was a replacement in both the 2001 and 2004 Anglo-Welsh Cup finals as Newcastle emerged victorious from both.

He left Newcastle in 2011 to join Blaydon RFC who were then managed by his former Newcastle team-mate Micky Ward.

In 2004 he was called up to the senior England squad for the Investec Challenge match against Canada, but he remained on the bench and was ultimately never capped at that level.

References

External links
Newcastle profile
statistics from scrum.com

1979 births
Living people
English rugby union players
Newcastle Falcons players
Rugby union players from Durham, England
Rugby union scrum-halves